Dave Ross is an American businessman and Republican politician. He served as Secretary of the Wisconsin Department of Transportation under Governor Scott Walker from 2017 to 2019, and previously served in Walker's administration as the 1st Secretary of the Wisconsin Department of Safety and Professional Services, created in 2011.  He previously served 8 years as Mayor of Superior, Wisconsin.

Biography

Ross was born in Superior, Wisconsin, and obtained his bachelor's degree from the University of Wisconsin–Superior. He served for eight years as mayor of Superior from 2003 to 2011.  He was a candidate for Lieutenant Governor of Wisconsin in the 2010 Republican primary, but was defeated by Rebecca Kleefisch.

In 2011, Ross was appointed by Governor of Wisconsin Scott Walker to serve as Secretary of the newly established Department of Safety and Professional Services.

References

Living people
Politicians from Milwaukee
Politicians from Superior, Wisconsin
University of Wisconsin–Superior alumni
State cabinet secretaries of Wisconsin
Year of birth missing (living people)
Mayors of places in Wisconsin
Wisconsin Republicans
21st-century American politicians